Bolkar Mountains, also known as Bulgar Dagh or Bolghar Dagh, are a mountain range situated in the middle part of the Taurus mountains complex in southern Turkey bounded by the Göksu River to the west and the Pozantı River to the east. The northern part of the mountains lies in Niğde province, while the southern peaks rise in Mersin province.

Economy

In the early 20th-century, the mountains were noted as having large amounts of lead. A mine active in the region since 1825 was Bulgar Maden. As of 1920 it was still producing lead as a Turkish government ran enterprise. The ore from this mine was 44.2 percent lead. Silver and gold were occasionally found in the mines. The mine used a low quality smelting technique, which often threatened the quality of the product, leaving much of it lost. The gold and silver findings were sent to Istanbul for smelting.

Fauna
Montivipera bulgardaghica is a venomous viper species endemic originated from this mountain range.

References

External links
 Bulgar Maden from Hittite Monuments

Mountain ranges of Turkey
Physiographic provinces
Mediterranean Region, Turkey
Important Bird Areas of Turkey